Down is an English surname. Notable people with the surname include:

Alec Down (1914–1995), British archaeologist
Alisen Down (born 1976), Canadian actress
Angela Down (born 1946), English actress
Bill Down (born 1934), British Bishop
Billy Down (1898–1977), English footballer
Blaine Down (born 1982), Canadian ice hockey player
Dru Down (born 1969), American rapper and actor
Elissa Down, Australian filmmaker
Ernest Down (1902–1980), British Army officer
J.H. Down, English cricketer
James Blair Down (fl. 1999), Canadian citizen who operated a large telemarketing scam
James Down (born 1987), British rugby union player
John Langdon Down (1828–1896), British physician
John Thornton Down (1842–1866), British Army officer
Lesley-Anne Down (born 1954), English actress, model, and singer
Linda Down, American runner with cerebral palsy
Percy Down (1883–1954), English rugby union player
Philip Down (born 1953), Australian-English priest
Rick Down (1950–2019), American baseball coach

See also
Downs (surname)
Downes (surname)
Downing (surname)
Down (disambiguation)
Downs (disambiguation)

English-language surnames